Balbir Dutt is an Indian journalist. He is the Founder Director and Editor in Chief of Hindi daily Deshpran. He is also the author of several scholar books. Dutt is the recipient of prestigious Padma Shri award.

Early life
He was born in Rawalpindi in British India to a prominent and scholar family. His father Shri Shivdas Dutt was renowned a businessman in Rawalpindi. His studies and upbringing took place in Rawalpindi, Dehradun, Ambala and Ranchi.

Career
Dutt started journalism in Ranchi and became editor of "Ranchi Express" in 1963. He edited weekly "Jai Matrubhumi" and daily "Deshpran". He has been a writer and columnist in many newspapers and magazines. He is a member of, working Committee of South Asia Free Media Association, South Asian Association for Regional Cooperation. He is also a member of the "Editors guild of India" and "National Union of Journalists". He has taught editorial journalism and newspaper management in Ranchi University as a Guest Lecturer for 25 years.

Works
Balbir Dutt has written several books namely "Kahani Jharkhand Andolan Ki", Safarnama Pakistan", "Jaipal Singh: Ek Romanchak Ankahi Kahani and Emergency ka Kahar aur Censor ka Zahar. He is currently working on several other books on subjects that include politics, journalism, Partition of India, Pakistan.

Awards and recognition
Dutt is the recipient of "Rashtriya Patrakarita Puraskar", "Patrakarita Shikhar Samman", "Jharkhand Gaurav Samman", "Krantikari Patrakarita Puraskar", "Lifetime Achievement Award" by Government of Jharkhand, "Mahanayak Sharda Samman". In 2017, He was honoured with Padma Shri by Pranab Mukherjee, the then President of India for his distinct achievements in the field of journalism.

References 

Living people
Recipients of the Padma Shri in literature & education
1935 births
People from Jharkhand
Indian journalists